Polk City is a city in Polk County, Florida, United States. The population was 1,562 at the 2010 census. As of 2018, the population recorded by the U.S. Census Bureau is 2,422. It is part of the Lakeland–Winter Haven Metropolitan Statistical Area.

History

Polk City was incorporated as a Town in 1925, and changed by ordinance to the City of Polk City in 2005. The city was named after the county, itself named after James Knox Polk, the eleventh president of the United States.

Geography

Polk City is located within the Central Florida Highlands area of the Atlantic coastal plain with a terrain consisting of flatland interspersed with gently rolling hills.

Climate

Polk City is located in the humid subtropical zone (Köppen climate classification: Cfa).

Demographics

As of the census of 2000, there were 1,516 people, 542 households, and 422 families residing in the town. The racial makeup of the town was 94.13% White, 1.91% African American, 0.33% Native American, 0.40% Asian, 1.78% from other races, and 1.45% from two or more races. Hispanic or Latino of any race were 8.11% of the population.

There were 542 households, out of which 39.1% had children under the age of 18 living with them, 55.4% were married couples living together, 14.9% had a female householder with no husband present, and 22.0% were non-families. 17.2% of all households were made up of individuals, and 5.2% had someone living alone who was 65 years of age or older. The average household size was 2.80 and the average family size was 3.07.
In the town the population was spread out, with 29.8% under the age of 18, 7.4% from 18 to 24, 32.4% from 25 to 44, 19.9% from 45 to 64, and 10.6% who were 65 years of age or older. The median age was 34 years. For every 100 females, there were 97.4 males. For every 100 females age 18 and over, there were 95.6 males.

The median income for a household in the town was $32,083, and the median income for a family was $36,705. Males had a median income of $28,158 versus $20,579 for females. The per capita income for the town was $14,108. About 13.6% of families and 13.4% of the population were below the poverty line, including 11.2% of those under age 18 and 5.7% of those age 65 or over.

Arts and culture

Annual cultural events

There is a yearly Founder's Day festival in midtown park located at the beginning of General James A. Van Fleet State Trail.

Museums and other points of interest

Fantasy of Flight, an aviation-related attraction, takes visitors back to the pioneering days of early flight, World War I, World War II and beyond. The museum closed in April 2014 but is planned to reopen later in a downscaled form.
Polk City Community Library is a public library that is a member of the Polk County Library Cooperative. It provides free computer use and interlibrary loan services. The library is located at 215 S. Bougainvillea Avenue.

Sports

While small in both size and population Polk City offers its residents a vast array of activities throughout the year. For children there is Tee-Ball and Little League as well as a Pee-Wee football league.

Government

Polk City is governed by a five-person council that elects a mayor and vice mayor from its membership.

Utilities

The Polk City power grid is supported by distribution lines from Lakeland Electric and TECO.

Infrastructure

Transportation

Interstate 4 – Located just south of town, this freeway is a major highway in central Florida, leading westward to Lakeland and Tampa and eastward to Orlando.
SR 33 – Called Commonwealth Avenue, this road leads southward to Lakeland and northward across the Green Swamp, toward Groveland.
SR 559 – This road leads southward to I-4 and Auburndale.

References

External links

Polk City Florida Official Website Portal style website, Government, Business, Library, Recreation and more
Map of Polk City in 1927
City-Data.com Comprehensive Statistical Data and more about Polk City

Cities in Polk County, Florida
Populated places established in 1925
Cities in Florida
1925 establishments in Florida